Sennett Federated Church and Parsonage is a historic church formed in 1929 from the combining of Baptist and Congregational churches located in the hamlet of Sennett, in the town of Sennett in Cayuga County, New York. Both congregations were committed to the abolition movement and to the Underground Railroad.  The church was constructed in 1848 for the Congregational church and probably incorporates part of an earlier 1820 church building. The parsonage was built in 1818 and was constructed as a 16 feet by 24 feet frame building.  It was enlarged in the mid 19th century into a typical Greek Revival style gable and wing building, perhaps incorporating the earlier structure as the west wing.

It was listed on the National Register of Historic Places in 2005.

The church was covered in vinyl siding in the 1990s.  The vinyl covers cornices, sides, eaves, and even two of the main four pillars of the front facade.  The stained glass windows from the early 20th century are protected by plastic sheets.  Railings which might appear to be original are not;  they are vinyl as well.  Only the two round pillars seem to be anything like original surfaces.

References

External links
Sennett Federated Church website

Churches on the National Register of Historic Places in New York (state)
Churches completed in 1848
19th-century churches in the United States
Churches in Cayuga County, New York
Churches on the Underground Railroad
Federated congregations in the United States
National Register of Historic Places in Cayuga County, New York
Underground Railroad in New York (state)
Sennett, New York